Her Majesty's Advocate v Alexander Elliot Anderson Salmond was the 2020 criminal prosecution of Alex Salmond, the former First Minister of Scotland. Salmond faced 14 charges, mostly of sexual assault. The trial began on 9 March 2020 at the High Court in Edinburgh and concluded on 23 March 2020 with the jury acquitting him of all charges.

Background
In August 2018, Salmond resigned from the SNP in the face of allegations of sexual misconduct in 2013 while he was First Minister. In a statement, he said that he wanted to avoid internal division within the party and intended to apply to rejoin the SNP once he had an opportunity to clear his name.

The Scottish Government investigated the allegations. On 30 August 2018, Salmond launched a crowdfunding appeal to pay for the legal costs of seeking a judicial review into the fairness of the process by which the Scottish Government handled the allegations. Salmond closed the appeal two days later, 1 September, after raising £100,000, double the amount he wanted to pay for his legal costs. The government later conceded that its procedures had been flawed and paid more than £500,000 in Salmond's legal expenses. On 8 January 2019, he won his inquiry case against Scottish government. The Scottish government admitted it had breached its own guidelines by appointing an investigating officer who had "prior involvement" in the case. Salmond also asked permanent secretary to the Scottish Government, Leslie Evans, to consider her position. Evans stated that the complaints the government had received in January 2018 had not been withdrawn, so the option of re-investigating them remained on the table, once the police probe into the allegations had run its course.

On 24 January 2019, Police Scotland arrested Salmond, and he was charged with 14 offences, including two counts of attempted rape, nine of sexual assault, two of indecent assault, and one of breach of the peace. In a statement outside Edinburgh Sheriff Court, he denied any criminality. He appeared in court on 21 November 2019 and entered a plea of "not guilty".

Trial
The trial started on 9 March 2020. His defence was led by Gordon Jackson with Shelagh McCall as joint senior co-counsel; the prosecution was led by Alex Prentice.

The first witness was "Woman H", who gave an account of how Salmond allegedly tried to rape her in Bute House after a private dinner in June 2014. She had not mentioned this incident when she first talked to police in 2018. The defence suggested that she fabricated the allegations, which the witness rejected. A second witness present at the dinner in question gave evidence stating that "Woman H" was not even present at Bute House on the night in question.

One witness claimed that women were banned from working alone with Salmond within the Scottish civil service.

During the trial, the defence claimed that the married Mr Salmond, characterised as "touchy-feely", who admitted to sexual contact with two of the complainants, both junior to him and much younger, could act inappropriately, and led witnesses who called him "extraordinarily pugnacious" and "extremely demanding".

On 23 March Salmond was found not guilty on 12 charges, not proven on one charge and one was withdrawn by the crown.

Shortly after the trial, a tape emerged apparently showing Gordon Jackson on a crowded train making negative comments and naming two of the alleged victims in the case.

See also
 Trial by jury in Scotland

References

Alex Salmond
High Court of Justiciary cases
2020 in Scotland
Criminal trials that ended in acquittal
Trials of political people
Political sex scandals in the United Kingdom
Sex crime trials
Violence against women in Scotland